GKS Tychy is a Polish professional football club, based in Tychy, Poland, that plays in the Polish I Liga. The club was founded on 20 April 1971. It played in the Ekstraklasa between 1974–1977. The biggest success of GKS Tychy was the 2nd place in the 1975/76 season of the Ekstraklasa, behind Stal Mielec. As a result, the team played in the UEFA Cup 1976–77, losing to 1. FC Köln.

History
The history of GKS Tychy dates back to 20 April 1971, when the government of the county of Tychy, together with Communist party activists (PZPR), decided to form a powerful sports organization. As a result of the merger of Polonia Tychy, Gornik Wesola and Gornik Murcki, a strong, multi-department sports club was formed, with football and ice-hockey as its major departments. Before the creation of GKS Tychy, ice-hockey players of Gornik Murcki had twice won the Cup of Poland (1967 and 1971).

The decision to merge the teams from Murcki and Wesola was not welcomed by members of local communities, who wanted to keep their organizations. The Tychy County government did not care about these concerns, as the plan was to form a strong club, with top class athletes. GKS Tychy was financially supported by local coal mines, from Tychy, Ledziny, Wesola and Bieruń. A new, 20,000 stadium was built, together with a swimming pool and ice-skating rink. By 1973, GKS Tychy had over 600 athletes in seven departments, including football, ice-hockey, wrestling, and track and field.

Two years after its creation, the football team of GKS Tychy won promotion to the second level of Polish football tier, and in early summer of 1974, the team was promoted to Ekstraklasa. With its topscorer Roman Ogaza, Tychy in August 1974 debuted in Ekstraklasa, in a 1–1 game vs. Lech Poznan. In 1975–76 Ekstraklasa, GKS Tychy finished second, after Polish champion Stal Mielec, and in the UEFA Cup, it played against West German side Köln. In the first leg, in Cologne (15 September 1976), Tychy lost 0–2. In the second leg, which took place on 29 September 1976 at Silesian Stadium in Chorzow, Polish team tied 1-1, after a goal by Roman Ogaza. Ogaza himself was a member of Polish football team, which won silver in the 1976 Summer Olympics in Montreal, becoming the first athlete in the history of Tychy to win an olympic medal.

In the 1976–77 Ekstraklasa, GKS Tychy, to the surprise of experts, was relegated from Polish top division, despite the fact that its top players remained at Tychy. After several seasons in Polish Second Division, GKS was once again relegated (1983) to the third level of Polish football tier, remaining there until 1993. After a merger with Sokol Pniewy, the new team, called Sokol Tychy-Pniewy, played in 1995–96 Ekstraklasa and 1996–97 Ekstraklasa. Due to financial difficulties, the team was dissolved in 1997. Soon afterwards, new organization, called Tyski Klub Sportowy Tychy was founded.

Previous names

20 April 1971 – 1996: Górniczy Klub Sportowy Tychy
1996: Sokół Tychy
1997: Górniczy Klub Sportowy Tychy
1998: TKS Tychy
2000: Górnośląski Klub Sportowy Tychy '71
2008: Górniczy Klub Sportowy Tychy

GKS Tychy in Europe

Players

Out on loan

Personnel

Current technical staff

Other sports 

Active sections
 Basketball
 Ice Hockey

Notable players

Had international caps for their respective countries. Players listed in bold represented their countries while playing for Tychy.
Bosnia & Herzegovina
 Filip Arežina (2016)
Democratic Republic of the Congo
 Wilson Kamavuaka (2020)
Estonia
 Ken Kallaste (2019–2020)
Kyrgyzstan
 Edgar Bernhardt (2018–2019)
Moldova
 Eugen Zasavițchi (2017)
Poland
 Krzysztof Bizacki (1990–1993, 1995–1996, 2008–2014)
 Eugeniusz Cebrat (1971–1977, 1979–1983)
 Jerzy Dudek (1995–1996) (pictured)
 Dariusz Fornalak (1996–1997)
 Seweryn Gancarczyk (2015–2017)
 Radosław Gilewicz (1991–1992)
 Dariusz Grzesik (1984, 2004)
 Bartosz Karwan (1993)
 Ryszard Komornicki (1980–1982)
 Ryszard Kraus (1994–1995)
 Jerzy Ludyga (1975–1979)
 Janusz Nawrocki (1995–1997)
 Krzysztof Nowak (1995–1996)
 Roman Ogaza (1975–1978)
 Lechosław Olsza (1975–1977)
 Sebastian Przyrowski (2015)
 Marcin Radzewicz (2014–2018)
 Marek Rzepka (1995–1997)
 Jakub Świerczok (2016–2017)
 Krystian Szuster (1996–1997)
 Rafał Szwed (1996–1997)
 Bogusław Wyparło (1996–1997)
Trinidad and Tobago
 Keon Daniel (2018–2020)
Zimbabwe
 Edelbert Dinha (1995–1996)

References

External links
 
 GKS Tychy at 90minut.pl

 
Football clubs in Silesian Voivodeship
Association football clubs established in 1971
1971 establishments in Poland
Sport in Tychy
Mining association football clubs in Poland